ME1 or ME-1 may refer to:
 ME1 (gene)
 Maine's 1st congressional district
 Mass Effect (video game)
 U.S. Route 1 in Maine
 SIRT ME-1
 Me1 vs Me2 Snooker with Richard Herring